Madpur is a village in the Kharagpur II CD block in the Kharagpur subdivision of the Paschim Medinipur district in the state of West Bengal, India.

Geography

Location
Madpur is located at.

Area overview
Kharagpur subdivision, shown partly in the map alongside, mostly has alluvial soils, except in two CD blocks in the west – Kharagpur I and Keshiary, which mostly have lateritic soils. Around 74% of the total cultivated area is cropped more than once. With a density of population of 787 per km2 nearly half of the district’s population resides in this subdivision. 14.33% of the population lives in urban areas and 86.67% lives in the rural areas.

Note: The map alongside presents some of the notable locations in the subdivision. All places marked in the map are linked in the larger full screen map.

Demographics
As per 2011 Census of India Madpur had a total population of 3,210 of which 1,617 (50%) were males and 1,593 (50%) were females. Population below 6 years was 327. The total number of literates in Madpur was 2,351 (73.24% of the population over 6 years).

.* For language details see Kharagpur II#Language and religion

Civic administration

CD Block HQ
The headquarters of Kharagpur II Block are located at Madpur.

Transport

Madpur is a station on the Howrah-Kharagpur line of South Eastern Railway.

Education
Government General Degree College, Kharagpur-II at Ambigere, Madpur, in Kharagpur II CD Block was established in 2015.

References

Villages in Paschim Medinipur district